The Sanremo Music Festival 2021 was the 71st edition of the annual Sanremo Music Festival, a television song contest held in the Teatro Ariston of Sanremo, organised and broadcast by RAI. The show was held between 2 and 6 March 2021.

The show was presented by Amadeus, who also served as the artistic director for the competition. Fiorello returned as co-host after appearing as a regular guest in the previous edition.

Format
The 2021 edition of the Sanremo Music Festival took place at the Teatro Ariston in Sanremo, organized by the Italian public broadcaster RAI. The artistic director and the presenter for the competition was Amadeus, for the second consecutive year.

For the first time in the event's history, the Festival took place without a live audience, due to the COVID-19 pandemic.

Presenters
Shortly after the end of the 2020 edition, RAI officially confirmed Amadeus as the presenter of the 71st edition of the Sanremo Music Festival. Together with Amadeus, Italian comedian and television presenter Fiorello returned, after appearing as a regular guest in the previous edition, to cover the role of co-host. Alongside Amadeus and Fiorello, five co-hosts alternated during the five evenings: Matilda De Angelis, Elodie, Vittoria Ceretti, Barbara Palombelli and Beatrice Venezi. British supermodel Naomi Campbell was set to participate as co-host in the first evening, but due to restrictions imposed in United States for the containment of the COVID-19 pandemic, she had to give up the aforementioned role.

Voting
Voting occurred through the combination of four methods:
 Public televoting, carried out via landline, mobile phone, the contest's official mobile app, and online voting.
 Jury of the Press Room, TV, Radio and Web.
 Demoscopic jury, composed by music fans who voted from their homes via an electronic voting system managed by Ipsos.
 Musicians and singers of the Sanremo Music Festival Orchestra.

Voting during the five evenings for Big Artist section:
 First evening: Demoscopic jury.
 Second evening: Demoscopic jury.
 Third evening: Music and singers of the Sanremo Music Festival Orchestra.
 Fourth evening: Jury of the Press Room, TV, Radio and Web.
 Fifth evening: Televote. At the end, a ranking of the songs/artists was drawn up determined by the average of voting percentages obtained in all the evenings, determining the three finalist. To select the winner the voting systems had the following weight: 34% Public televoting; 33% Jury of the Press Room, TV, Radio and Web; 33% Demoscopic Jury.

Voting during the three evenings for Newcomers' section:
 First evening: The voting systems had the following weight: 34% Public televoting; 33% Jury of the Press Room, TV, Radio and Web; 33% Demoscopic Jury.
 Second evening: The voting systems had the following weight: 34% Public televoting; 33% Jury of the Press Room, TV, Radio and Web; 33% Demoscopic Jury.
 Fourth evening: The voting systems had the following weight: 34% Public televoting; 33% Jury of the Press Room, TV, Radio and Web; 33% Demoscopic Jury.

Selections

Newcomers' section
The artists competing in the Newcomers' section were selected through two separate contests: Sanremo Giovani and Area Sanremo.

Sanremo Giovani 2020
On 7 October 2020, Rai Commission for Sanremo Music Festival 2021 announced a list of 961 acts, but only 61 artists coming from all Italian regions -excluding Basilicata and Valle d'Aosta- and from abroad were selected in the first phase.

On 20 October 2020, the jury of Sanremo Festival 2021 has selected the 20 semi-finalists. The selection was preceded by five late night shows on "AmaSanremo", conducted by Amadeus and Riccardo Rossi, where the artists and their entries were presented and were selected the 10 finalist.

On 17 December 2020, the ten finalists performed their songs at Sanremo Casino in Sanremo, with the show Sanremo Giovani 2020 broadcast on Rai 1 presented by Amadeus and Riccardo Rossi. The six selected by the jury composed by Luca Barbarossa, Beatrice Venezi and Piero Pelù, televote and music commission were added to the two entries of Area Sanremo, for a total of eight young emerging artists in the category of the Newcomers' section of the Sanremo Music Festival 2021. Gaudiano, Folcast, Greta Zuccoli, Davide Shorty, Wrongonyou and Avincola were chosen as contestants of the Newcomers' section of the Sanremo Music Festival 2021.

Area Sanremo
After the auditions, RAI Commission - composed by Vittorio De Scalzi, Rossana Casale, Gianmaurizio Foderaro, Erica Mou and G-Max; plus the participation of Maurilio Giordana - identified 8 finalists for the competition among the 600 acts:

 Aurora Fadell
 Dellai
 Elena Faggi
 Federica Marinari
 Francesca Miola
 Guasto
 Luca d'Arbenzio
 Mirall

Newcomers' Finalists 

 Gaudiano - "Polvere da sparo" 
 Folcast - "Scopriti" 
 Greta Zuccoli - "Ogni cosa sa di te"
 Davide Shorty - "Regina" 
 Wrongonyou - "Lezioni di volo"
 Avincola - "Goal!"
 Elena Faggi - "Che ne so"
 Dellai - "Io sono Luca"

Big section
The Big Artists section of the contest saw the participation of 26 artists. All the artists performed and were scored throughout the week, and every competing artist advanced to the final night.

Competing entries

Shows

First evening 
The first thirteen Big Artists each performed their song and the first four Newcomers each performed their song for the first time in two matches, two for each one.

Big Artists

Newcomers

Second evening 
The other thirteen Big Artists each performed their song and the other four Newcomers each performed their song for the first time.

Big Artists

Newcomers

Third evening 
All the twenty-six Big Artists each performed a song that are part of the history of the Italian music. The artists can choose whether or not to be accompanied by Italian or foreign guests.

Big Artists

Fourth evening 
The twenty-six Big Artists performed their songs once again, and the winner of the Newcomers' section was decided.

Big Artists

Newcomers

Fifth evening 
The twenty-six Big Artists performed their entry for a final time. The top three songs moved on to the superfinal, which decided the winner of Sanremo 2021.

Superfinal

Special guests
The special guests of Sanremo Music Festival 2021 were:

 Singers / musicians: Achille Lauro, Boss Doms, Alessandra Amoroso, Andrea Morricone, Banda musicale della Polizia di Stato, Banda musicale della Marina Militare, Bottari di Portico, Emma Marrone, Gigi D'Alessio, Enzo Dong, Enzo Avitabile, Mahmood, Fausto Leali, Diodato, Dardust, Francesco Gabbani, Gigliola Cinquetti, Il Volo, Ivan Granatino, Lele Blade, Max D'Ambra, Laura Pausini, Loredana Bertè, Marcella Bella, Negramaro, Michele Zarrillo, Paolo Vallesi, Riccardo Fogli, Samurai Jay, Stefano di Battista, Tecla Insolia, Olga Zakharova, Ornella Vanoni, Umberto Tozzi.
 Actors / comedians / directors / models: Claudio Santamaria, Francesca Barra, Valeria Fabrizi, Antonella Ferrari, Monica Guerritore, Matilde Gioli, Serena Rossi.
 Sports people: Alberto Tomba, Federica Pellegrini, Zlatan Ibrahimović, Siniša Mihajlović, Donato Grande, Cristiana Girelli, Alex Schwazer.
 Other persons or notable figures: Alessia Bonari, Giacomo Castellana, Urban Theory.

Broadcast and ratings

Local broadcast 
Rai 1 and Rai Radio 2 brings the official broadcasts of the festival in Italy. The five evenings were also streamed online via the broadcaster's official website RaiPlay.

Ratings Sanremo Music Festival 2021
The audience is referred to that of Rai 1.

International broadcast
The international television service Rai Italia broadcast the competition in the Americas, Africa, Asia, Australia and Europe.

References

2021 in Italian television
2021 song contests
March 2021 events in Italy
Sanremo Music Festival by year